All Creatures Great and Small is a television series, set in 1937, based upon a series of books about a Yorkshire veterinarian written by Alf Wight under the pen name of James Herriot. The series was produced by Playground Entertainment for Channel 5 in the United Kingdom and PBS in the United States.

The series is a new adaptation of Wight's books, following the previous BBC series of 90 episodes that ran from 1978 to 1990 and a number of other films and television series based on Herriot's novels. It is filmed in the Yorkshire Dales, and received some funding from Screen Yorkshire. 

The first series, which consists of six episodes and a special Christmas episode, was filmed to coincide with the 50th anniversary of the publication of the first book in the James Herriot series. The series premiered in the UK on Channel 5 on 1 September 2020 and in the US on PBS as part of Masterpiece on 10 January 2021.

Following a second series in late 2021, the show was renewed for two further series, each composed of six episodes and a Christmas special, in January 2022. Filming on the third series began in March 2022. The first episode aired in the UK on 15 September 2022 and in the US on 8 January 2023.

Premise
The show revolves around a trio of veterinary surgeons working in the Yorkshire Dales beginning in 1937. Siegfried Farnon (described as an "eccentric") hires James Herriot into his veterinary practice at Skeldale House. Besides Siegfried and James, there is Siegfried's younger brother, Tristan, and Mrs Hall, their housekeeper.

Cast
Nicholas Ralph as James Herriot, a veterinary surgeon
Samuel West as Siegfried Farnon, a veterinary surgeon and owner of Skeldale House
Anna Madeley as Mrs Audrey Hall, housekeeper of Skeldale House
Callum Woodhouse as Tristan Farnon, Siegfried's younger brother
Rachel Shenton as Helen Alderson (later Helen Herriot), a farmer's daughter and James's love interest

Recurring
Diana Rigg (series 1) and Patricia Hodge (series 2 and 3) as Mrs Pumphrey, the wealthy owner of the indulged Pekingese Tricki Woo
Matthew Lewis as Hugh Hulton, a wealthy landowner who competes with James for Helen's affections
 Maimie McCoy as Dorothy, Mrs Hall's friend and Siegfried's love interest (series 1)
 Mollie Winnard as Maggie, barmaid at the Drovers Arms and Tristan's love interest
 Tony Pitts as Richard Alderson, Helen's father
 Imogen Clawson as Jenny Alderson, Helen's sister
 Dorothy Atkinson as Diana Brompton, a flirtatious divorcée who has a casual romance with Siegfried (series 2)
 Will Thorp as Gerald Hammond (series 2-3)
 Gabriel Quigley as Hannah Herriott, James's mother
 Drew Cain as James Herriot Sr., James's father

Production

Cast and characters
Actor Nicholas Ralph did a great deal of research on James Herriot ("Alf" Wight) who died in 1995. He also met the vet's son and daughter, Jim and Rosie. "They spoke a lot about Donald and Brian, the real Siegfried and Tristan. They said to me that I had the hardest job because Alf is a kind of observer to these bigger, larger-than-life personalities", he recalled. Naturally, the actor required training in veterinary procedures for authenticity in the show. "Straight off the bat with our on-set vet adviser Andy Barrett, we were up close and personal with horses, sheep, kind of going through the procedures and things that we would be doing. Learning how to approach the animal and everything like that. Using the stethoscope on the cow's heart, then lungs, then stomach" the actor recalled.

Although James Herriot/Alf Wight had a "soft, lilting Scottish accent" according to Christopher Timothy who played Herriot in the original TV adaptation, the actor was instructed to keep his speech neutral for universality when the BBC series was being filmed. That did not apply to Nicholas Ralph when filming this adaptation; the actor used his genuine Scottish accent.

The New York Times indicated that Donald Sinclair actually had more rough edges than the Siegfried character in the books (and in the TV productions). "Sinclair's real-life behaviour was much more eccentric (he once discharged a shotgun during a dinner party to let his guests know it was time to leave)".

Significant changes were made from the source material (both the previous television series and the memoir), such as Siegfried Farnon being a heartbroken widower and a dramatically increased role for Mrs Hall, who has been reimagined as a young, live-in housekeeper and a "slightly warmer figure" than in the novels. The role of Helen was also greatly expanded.

Working with animals
For his role as a veterinary surgeon, Ralph required training in veterinary procedures. For some scenes, however, the production used animal prosthetics: "the back end of the cow, fully functional and everything". One episode portrayed the birth of a calf; that was filmed separately and "was then spliced in seamlessly with footage of the main actors".  Ralph admits that "for 90 percent of those scenes with the animals, the animals actually weren't there. It was just cleverly chosen and prosthetics and extremely well-trained, happy animals when we did see them".

Some of Ralph's work involved interaction with live animals, such as a bull in one episode and a horse rearing and kicking in another. "Straight off the bat with our on-set vet adviser Andy Barrett, we were up close and personal with horses, sheep, kind of going through the procedures and things that we would be doing", Ralph said. "Learning how to approach the animal and everything like that. Using the stethoscope on the cow's heart, then lungs, then stomach..." "I have huge respect for... Andy Barrett and the animal handlers who worked on the show", Ralph told an interviewer.

In interviews after the filming of series three, Ralph said that the crew had experienced problems with getting cooperation from cats: one bolted off the set while he was trying to examine it. "They are impossible to train!", according to the actor. He was already confident and comfortable working with large animals but spoke of an incident when a cow went out of control after a scene was filmed. "The handlers were holding on to it and had to like roll out of the way as the cow basically galloped, so he had to hit the deck and rolled very professionally out of the way." Ralph was relieved not to have been near the animal when that occurred.

Filming locations

The first series was filmed largely in the Yorkshire Dales (often around Nidderdale); the village of Grassington in Upper Wharfedale was used for the fictional village of Darrowby. The BBC series, which was broadcast between 1978 and 1990, had been filmed in the northern part of the Dales, (Wensleydale and Swaledale), with the village Askrigg used for the fictional Darrowby.

When discussing the new series, actor Rachel Shenton was enthusiastic about the locations. "We... shot in and around the Dales", she said. "The Dales are miles and miles of beautiful, undulating countryside and it really is breathtaking." Neither the BBC series or the new series was filmed in Thirsk (where the actual vet, Alf Wight, practised) since it had become too large for the small-town feel that the producers wanted. "The nice thing was that there weren't any modern houses in the town centre... so we didn't have to change anything completely. What we did change were all the shop signs and the usual things like aerials, satellite dishes, alarm boxes and all of those things." 

In Grassington, the Devonshire Inn was rebranded as the Drovers Arms, while the pub interiors were shot at The Green Dragon Inn at Hardraw. The village bakery, Walker's, was used for the Darrowby Cycles property; a private residence was used for the exterior of Skeldale House.  The Stripey Badger book store became the greengrocers G F Endleby, the shoe store Helen Midgley was used for Handleys Booksellers and the Rustic Rabbit gift store became Higgins Bakers.

The home of Mrs Pumphrey, the owner of Tricki-Woo, was filmed at Broughton Hall in Broughton, Craven; the character was based on Marjorie Warner, a client of Alf Wight,
who lived at Thorpe House near Thirsk.  
Many of the scenes for the series were filmed in a studio. Parts of the first episode (with the waterfall and pool) were filmed at Janet's Foss near Malham. Other locations included the Barden Bridge at the Bolton Abbey Estate and the Ripon Racecourse. The church featured in the Christmas special is St Wilfrid's at Burnsall, near Grassington, the crossroads are "on the roads above Pateley Bridge" in Nidderdale and the farm is in Airton. 

The steam train in the first series was filmed on the Keighley & Worth Valley Railway line; Keighley Station stands in for a Glasgow station in the first episode, and Oakworth railway station appears in both the first and second episodes.

The six episodes and the Christmas special were filmed from 2019 into early 2020. Much of the outdoor work was completed "during winter and autumn, and it was freezing, with long, cold, dark days and rainy days", according to Ralph.

In March 2021, filming had started for the second series, and included some new locations.

Filming for the third series ran from March to July 2022.

Second series
Pre-production work had begun on the second set of episodes by early 2021. The production company made appeals for historic artefacts and props, as they prepared to film the next chapters of James Herriot's life. Due to lockdown restrictions, they were struggling to find everything from homeware to farming implements made before 1938. They plan to buy as many artefacts and props as they can because they expect to film multiple series of All Creatures Great and Small.

Executive producer Colin Callender said in early 2021 that filming had been postponed due to restrictions necessitated by the COVID-19 pandemic. "We are using this time to commission Ben Vanstone [the writer] and the writing team to work on season two... we're able to use this lockdown period to work on the development and script development". In February 2021, Vanstone said that most scripts had been written; he expected filming to start in late March (if the restrictions allowed). The writer hinted that the relationship between James and Helen would be developed; "we want to explore why they're together and why they work with one another". In the relationship between Tristan and Siegfried, the latter will be "desperate to move forward in his relationship with his brother". Siegfried's relationship with Dorothy would continue, but "there are still plenty of opportunities for him to mess things up", Vanstone commented.

In early 2021, Ralph told PBS that he expected to see all of the principal actors when filming started, saying "The cast will be back of course... and I've heard a lot of the crew are coming back as well". West added that director Brian Percival would also be returning.

Actor Diana Rigg died after the first series had been completed. Callender said that the producers were uncertain as to "what we will do with the character of Mrs Pumphrey" (The Mrs Pumphrey character was based on a client of Wight's, Marjorie Warner, who owned a Pekingese named Bambi). In April 2021, an announcement stated that Patricia Hodge had been cast in the role. Other new cast members include Dorothy Atkinson as Diana Brompton, a possible love interest for Siegfried, and James Fleet as Colonel Hubert Merrick, a farmer who appeared in the Herriot book.

Filming was underway by March 2021 for the second series of six episodes and a Christmas special. Scheduled locations included the Bradford area (initially in Little Germany, Bradford, standing in for Glasgow), Kettlewell and Grassington (for the fictional village of Darrowby) as well as the Yorkshire Dales.

Third series
In January 2022, the show was renewed for a further two series. Filming on Series Three took place in locations including Arncliffe, North Yorkshire, Grassington, Harrogate, Summerbridge, North Yorkshire and Pateley Bridge. 

This series is set in spring 1939 and includes some changes including the following. Tristan is finally fully qualified, James starts a new phase of life after marrying Helen and becomes a partner in the business; the practice gets involved in the new   bovine tuberculosis testing programme. By then, World War II is on the horizon and people are being encouraged to enlist. Veterinarians work in a "protected profession" because of the importance of their roles, so are not required to serve but, in the final episode, James decides to enlist.

Episodes

Series 1 (2020)

Christmas special (2020)

Series 2 (2021)

Christmas special (2021)

Series 3 (2022)

Christmas special (2022)

Reception
The first episode was watched by 3.3 million viewers overnight and earned an audience share of 20.4%, making All Creatures Great and Small Channel 5's highest rated show since February 2016. By using BARB's consolidated ratings for programmes watched live and on catch-up services (within 28 days), All Creatures Great and Small became their most popular show ever (until 2021) with the premiere episode having grown to 5.4 million viewers (up from 5.01m over a seven-day period) with a further 1.2 million watching the repeat on the Sunday night. In the United States - where the show is broadcast on PBS - the first series averaged more than 10 million viewers over the course of its run.

Metacritic, which uses a weighted average, assigned the show a score of 83 out of 100 based on six critics, indicating "universal acclaim". The Daily Telegraph'''s Michael Hogan gave the show four out of five, and commented "Revisiting the world of All Creatures Great and Small felt like meeting old friends. Any viewers missing the classic triumvirate of Robert Hardy, Christopher Timothy and Peter Davison were surely converted by this well-crafted opener, confidently directed by Downton Abbey alumnus Brian Percival". Hogan went on to call the show "family-friendly comfort-viewing. A soothing balm in febrile times".

As of March 2021, aggregator Rotten Tomatoes indicated that 96% of reviews had been positive. Variety was one of the publications that praised the first series. Its chief TV critic Caroline Framke wrote that All Creatures Great and Small "finds key ways to distinguish itself from depictions past, especially as it makes the most of a handsome budget and embraces a welcome, earnest warmth in its storytelling" and added that the update made "a beloved property worthwhile".
 NBC News praised the series as "pastoral perfection," saying the show was "never meant to be pandemic escapism... but it's hard to think of a better moment for something as simple and charming... sometimes all television (and the world) needs is someone with a gentle heart big enough to care for all creatures, great and small"; according to the network's cultural critic, Ani Bundel.

The Los Angeles Times's Mary McNamara was not quite as enthusiastic, disputing the apparent consensus of the show as being a necessary sanctuary in the pandemic zeitgeist, and calling the show "a disappointment" because it deviated too much, and jarringly so, from the source material. Nonetheless, the critic concluded "I was clearly happier with what I considered a very flawed adaptation of All Creatures Great and Small than many other television shows of my acquaintance... I found all the joy, solace and gentle but effective drama that had been previously promised".

Norman Vanamee of Town & Country'' called the second series "the perfect getaway."

See also
All Creatures Great and Small

References

External links
 
 
 
 

2020 British television series debuts
2020s British drama television series
Channel 5 (British TV channel) original programming
Television shows based on British novels
Television series about animals
Television series set in the 1930s
Television shows set in Yorkshire
English-language television shows
Television series by All3Media